Mamman Khan is an Indian politician and a member of 14th Haryana Legislative Assembly representing the Ferozepur Jhirka Assembly constituency. He is a member of the Indian National Congress.

References 

Living people
Year of birth missing (living people)
Haryana MLAs 2019–2024
Indian National Congress politicians from Haryana
People from Nuh district